Esmail Ahmadi-Moghaddam is an Iranian retired military officer who served as Iran's Chief of police, the chief commander of Law Enforcement Force of Islamic Republic of Iran, from 2005 to 2015.

Prior to the appointment, he served as deputy of Basij militia and its commander in Greater Tehran. Ahmadi-Moghaddam started his career at Islamic Revolution Committees and later was transferred to Islamic Revolutionary Guard Corps.

Ahmadi-Moghaddam has got a BA in Social Sciences from University of Tehran and obtained a master's degree in defense management from Army's University of Command and Staff, continued by a Ph.D. from Supreme National Defense University in military sciences.

For some time, he was commandant of Police University.

References

Living people
Chief commanders of Law Enforcement Force of Islamic Republic of Iran
1961 births
People from Tehran
University of Tehran alumni
Islamic Revolution Committees personnel
Islamic Revolutionary Guard Corps personnel of the Iran–Iraq War